Nicola Talamo (born 8 April 1996) is an Italian footballer who plays for Nocerina in Serie D.

Club career
Born in Pozzuoli, in the Province of Naples, Talamo started his career at local side Monteruscello Calcio. In 2013 he left for Serie D club Sora on loan. In 2014 Talamo was signed by Serie B club Latina, initially on loan. He played 13 first team appearances for Latina in Serie B, as well as for the reserve team of Latina (4 games and 4 goals as an overage player for the reserves in 2015–16 season) From January 2016 to June 2017 he left the club on loan to Maceratese, Siracusa and Cremonese.

Latina went bankrupted in 2017. Talamo became a free agent on 29 May 2017.

On 29 June 2017 Talamo signed a 2-year contract with Cremonese.

On 2 September 2019, his contract with Alessandria was dissolved by mutual consent.

References

External links

1996 births
People from Pozzuoli
Footballers from Campania
Living people
Italian footballers
Latina Calcio 1932 players
U.S. Cremonese players
Paganese Calcio 1926 players
U.S. Alessandria Calcio 1912 players
Siracusa Calcio players
A.S.G. Nocerina players
Association football forwards
Serie B players
Serie C players
Serie D players